Inonotus ludovicianus is a species of fungus in the family Hymenochaetaceae. A plant pathogen, it is found in the southwestern United States and Louisiana.

References

Fungi described in 1908
Fungi of North America
Fungal plant pathogens and diseases
ludovicianus